Fort Moore was the second of two historic U.S. Military Forts in Los Angeles, California, during the Mexican–American War.  It lay straight above the junction of the Hollywood Freeway and Broadway, on an historic hill that once sheltered the old Plaza.

The landmark hill took its name, Fort Hill, from the first fort, and the hill afforded sweeping views of the old adobe town and the vineyards in the swale of the Los Angeles River.  Fort Hill was a spur of the ridge that runs from the Quarry Hills (Elysian Park) southward to Beaudry’s Bunker Hill; it originally stretched east between 1st Street and Ord Street.  In old photographs, it forms a backdrop just behind the Plaza Church and square.  By 1949, what was left of the hill under the fort was cut down when the Hollywood Freeway was put through.
 
The fort is now memorialized by the Fort Moore Pioneer Memorial, a stone mural on Hill Street, along the south side of Grand Arts High School.

Mexican–American War
On August 13, 1846, early in the conflict, U.S. naval forces under Commodore Robert F. Stockton arrived at Los Angeles and raised the U.S. flag without opposition. A small occupying force of 50 Marines, under Captain Archibald H. Gillespie, built a rudimentary barricade on what was then known as Fort Hill overlooking the small town.

Siege of Los Angeles
The harsh martial law of Captain Gillespie soon ignited a popular uprising among Californios and Mexicans led by General José María Flores beginning on September 22, 1846. Known as the siege of Los Angeles, Californios assembled a force to retake Los Angeles. Gillespie's fifty marines were able to resist an initial attack on the government house in town and regrouped on Fort Hill, where they strengthened the fortification with sandbags and mounted their cannon. As time passed, the Californio forces opposing the U.S. takeover grew to just over 600 men, with several Californio citizens voicing opposition. General Flores offered an ultimatum: leave within 24 hours or face attack. Gillespie agreed to withdraw from Los Angeles, under safe passage, on September 30, 1846.

On October 7, the U.S. forces regrouped, with Commodore Stockton sending 350 Americans, including 200 U.S. Marines, under U.S. Navy Capt. William Mervine, to retake Los Angeles. The marines were defeated in their attempt at the Battle of Dominguez Rancho, as Stockton's fleet fled south to San Diego. In December, U.S. Army forces under Captain Stephen W. Kearny were defeated by the Californio Lancers at the Battle of San Pasqual. After regrouping and resupplying forces in San Diego, on January 10, 1847, Los Angeles was recaptured by the combined 700 man forces of John C. Fremont, Stockton and Kearny, after the Battle of Rio San Gabriel and the Battle of La Mesa. With the signing of the Treaty of Cahuenga on January 13, 1847, war in Alta California ended.

On January 12, 1847, to secure the area from future attack, U.S. forces began erecting a 400-foot (120 m) long breastwork on the same strategic site as the previous Fort Hill and named it the Post at Los Angeles. The plans were later revised, and on April 23 a larger defensive structure was begun on the same site. Constructed by the Mormon Battalion and the U.S. 1st Dragoons, it was designed for six cannons. It was never completed and was dedicated as Fort Moore on July 4, 1847, named after Captain Benjamin D. Moore, 1st Dragoons, one of 22 Americans killed in the Battle of San Pasqual in San Diego County, on December 6, 1846.

Post-War development
Lieutenant William T. Sherman ordered the garrison withdrawn in 1848, and the fort was abandoned in 1849 and decommissioned in 1853. In later years the site was leveled and became a public playground.

In August 1882, Jacob Philippi (c. 1835–1892) purchased a tract of land on Fort Moore Hill and built a beer garden. He had started the New York Brewery, the first brewery in Los Angeles, and had owned a saloon in the Temple Block in the center of town. On the summit of the hill he had a rambling structure erected, covering much of the ground with wide galleries, and for many years following, as the story went, local inhabitants of Los Angeles would climb the hill sober and roll down drunk.
 
It was an approximate equivalent of a later road house, an airy place with a view, refreshments and food, with half of its customers a polite crowd and half of them a tough lot.
 
After Philippi closed down his beer garden resort, he sold the place in 1887 to Mary (Hollister) Banning (1846–1919), widow of the "Father of the Port of Los Angeles" Phineas Banning. She converted it into a residence, what locals came to call the "Banning Mansion." She lived there several years with her daughters, Mary Banning (1871–1956) and Lucy Banning (1876–1929). The enormous old structure made a charming home, which was cut up into suitable parlors and bedrooms and elegantly furnished, with a fine view. It was the scene of many social events attended by the first families of the city who drove up to it in their carriages. With the growth of the city, however, society moved to newer districts and left the old place to end its days as a rooming house.

Cemetery
Part of Fort Moore Hill became home to a cemetery, with the first documented burial tracing back to December 19, 1853. Alternately known as Los Angeles City Cemetery, Protestant Cemetery, Fort Moore Hill Cemetery, Fort Hill Cemetery, or simply "the cemetery on the hill", it was the city's first non-Catholic cemetery.

The cemetery was overseen by the city starting in 1869. It was not well taken care of, lacking clearly delineated boundaries, complete records or adequate maintenance. The Los Angeles City Council passed a resolution on August 30, 1879, closing the cemetery to any future burials except for those with already reserved plots. By 1884, the city had sold portions of the cemetery as residential lots and the rest to the Los Angeles Board of Education (later the Los Angeles Unified School District (LAUSD)).

The city never removed any bodies, and the former cemetery was the site of repeated, grisly findings and much negative press. As a result, the city began moving the bodies, most to Evergreen Cemetery, Rosedale Cemetery and Hollywood Memorial Park Cemetery, with the final bodies being transferred in May 1947. The recent construction of Los Angeles High School #9 resulted in the discovery of additional human remains. These were excavated by archaeologists in 2006.

High school

In 1891, the site became home to the second location of Los Angeles High School (LAHS), located on North Hill Street between Sand Street (later California Street, now part of 101 Freeway) and Bellevue Avenue (later Sunset Boulevard, now Cesar Chavez Avenue).

LAHS was at this location on Fort Moore Hill until 1917, when the high school was moved again. Part of the site was later replaced by the headquarters of the LAUSD. Because of political and financial hardship caused by the construction of the nearby Belmont Learning Center, the LAUSD moved from the location in 2001 so that a new high school could be built on its location.

The new high school, formerly named Central Los Angeles Area New High School #9, is now named Ramon C. Cortines School of Visual and Performing Arts and is a part of the adjacent Los Angeles Cultural Corridor.

The 238,000 square foot (22,110 m2), $171.9 million facility was designed by the project team of Architect-of-Record HMC Architects and Designer-of-Record Austrian firm Coop Himmelb(l)au.

Most of Fort Moore Hill was removed in 1949 for the construction of the Hollywood Freeway, which was opened in December 1950, and in 1956 a memorial for the old fort and its American pioneers was placed on a site north of the freeway. A recent restoration was completed in January 2019.

See also
J. Win Austin, Los Angeles City Council member, 1941–43, opposed appropriation for monument.

References

External links
A Continent Divided: The U.S. - Mexico War, Center for greater Southwestern Studies, the University of Texas at Arlington

Moore
Moore
Buildings and structures in Downtown Los Angeles
Demolished buildings and structures in Los Angeles
Downtown Los Angeles
Demolished buildings and structures in California
1847 in Alta California
History of Los Angeles
Fort Moore Pioneer Memorial
Mormon Battalion